Stephen L. Goodman House is a historic home located at Glens Falls, Warren County, New York.  It was built about 1860 and is a five-bay, two-story, gable-roofed vernacular brick residence.  It is "T" shaped, consisting of a rectangular main block with a two-story brick and frame service wing.  It features a one-story entrance porch and porte cochere.  It was converted for use as a funeral home in 1945.

It was added to the National Register of Historic Places in 1984.

References

Houses on the National Register of Historic Places in New York (state)
Federal architecture in New York (state)
Houses completed in 1860
Houses in Warren County, New York
National Register of Historic Places in Warren County, New York